Jason of Pherae was the ruler of Thessaly during the period just before Philip II of Macedon came to power. He had succeeded Lycophron I of Pherae, possibly his father, as tyrant of Pherae and was appointed tagus, or chief magistrate, of Thessaly in the 370s BC and soon extended his control to much of the surrounding region. Controlling a highly trained mercenary force as well as the famous Thessalian cavalry, Jason briefly transformed Thessaly into a powerful Greek state and even spoke of invading the Persian Empire.

Life 
The geographer Pausanias records that Jason was familiar with the teachings of the Sophist Gorgias (6.17.9), and Isocrates claims to have been in contact with Jason, though none of this correspondence survives.(To the Children of Jason 1.1)

Aristotle records Jason as saying that "he had to do some few unjust things in order to do many just ones" in the Rhetoric Book I Chapter 12 Bekker lines 1373a25-27. ὥσπερ ἔφη Ἰάσων ὁ Θετταλὸς δεῖν ἀδικεῖν ἔνια, ὅπως δύνηται καὶ δίκαια πολλὰ ποιεῖν (Ross, 1959).

The figure of Jason makes a sudden appearance in the history of classical Greece with Xenophon swiftly mentioning his name during his commentary on Theban hegemony during the 370s. From seemingly out of nowhere arose a very ambitious proto-Philip general with a large and competent army. Xenophon quotes Jason as claiming:

I have men of other states as mercenaries to the number of six thousand, with whom, as I think, no city could easily contend. As for numbers,' he said, `of course as great a force might march out of some other city also; but armies made up of citizens include men who are already advanced in years and others who have not yet come to their prime. Furthermore, in every city very few men train their bodies, but among my mercenaries no one serves unless he is able to endure as severe toils as I myself.

There was a very realistic threat posed by Jason to his neighbours and arguably to all of Hellas. However, it has also been argued by Yalichev that the Thessalian showed signs of pan-Hellenism in his approach to the prominent poleis of the south, an attitude exemplified particularly in his warning to Thebes not to destroy Sparta after the Battle of Leuctra. Whether or not Jason had ambitions to rule over the entire Greek peninsula—as Philip II would after Chaeronea—can only be left to speculation. Regardless, Jason epitomises how one autocrat could suddenly rise to power through mercenary employment and threaten, both politically and militarily, his neighbouring poleis.

Death 
Jason was assassinated in 370 BC by a group of unidentified young men. Xenophon suggests the assassination may have been motivated by fear over Jason's perceived desire to take over control of the Oracle of Delphi following the Pythian Games. According to Xenophon, when the people of Delphi asked the oracle what they should do, the reply was that Apollo could take care of his own shrine (Hellenika 6.4.30). Diodorus Siculus, however, records that Jason's assassination was motivated either by the desire for fame or on the orders of his brother Polydorus (15.60.5).

Eventually Alexander, possibly his son, inherited the title of tagus and ruled harshly before finally being defeated by the Thebans.

Xenophon wrote of Jason:
His generalship is of the highest quality—he is one who whether his methods are those of plain force, or working in the dark, or of seizing an unexpected advantage, very seldom fails to achieve his objects. He can use the night-time as well as the day time, and when he wants to move fast, he will put breakfast and dinner into one meal, so as not to interrupt his work. He will not think it right to rest until he has reached the point for which he set out and done all that had to be done. And he has trained his men to behave in the same way, although he knows how to gratify the feelings of his soldiers when they have won some success as the results of extra hard work. So all who follow him have learned this too—that one can have a good time also, if one works for it. Then, too, he is more self controlled than any man I know with regard to bodily pleasures. These never take up his time and prevent him from doing what has to be done. 

The inventor of hemithorakion (half-armour equipment) is believed to be Jason of Pherae

Historical significance 
Jason of Pherae was a potentially major figure in Greek history whose potential remained unrealized because of his early death.  It is clear that he intended to create a regional empire in northern and eastern Hellas similar to the empire Dionysius I created in Sicily, and his career before it was cut short by assassins indicated that he had the talent and resources to do so. If he had lived longer, his empire might have assumed the dominant influence in Greece which shortly afterwards was achieved by Macedonia.

See also
Pherae
Thessaly

References

370 BC deaths
Ancient Greek rulers
Thessalian kings
4th-century BC Greek people
Ancient Greek inventors
Military history of ancient Thessaly
Late Classical Greece
Ancient Greeks who were murdered
Year of birth unknown
People from Feres